Thasycles is a genus of leaf beetles in the subfamily Eumolpinae. It is endemic to New Caledonia. For a long time it was treated as a synonym of Dematochroma, until it was reinstated as a valid genus in 2022.

Species
Eleven species are included in the genus:

 Thasycles castaneus Gómez-Zurita, 2022
 Thasycles compactus Gómez-Zurita, 2022
 Thasycles cordiformis Chapuis, 1874
 Thasycles fuscus (Jolivet, Verma & Mille, 2007)
 Thasycles grandis Gómez-Zurita, 2022
 Thasycles laboulbenei (Montrouzier, 1861)
 Thasycles magnus Gómez-Zurita, 2022
 Thasycles panieensis (Jolivet, Verma & Mille, 2007)
 Thasycles puncticollis Gómez-Zurita, 2022
 Thasycles tenuis Gómez-Zurita, 2022
 Thasycles variegatus Gómez-Zurita, 2022

References

Eumolpinae
Chrysomelidae genera
Beetles of Oceania
Insects of New Caledonia
Taxa named by Félicien Chapuis
Endemic fauna of New Caledonia